John Bede Polding, OSB (18 November 1794 in 16 March 1877 ) was the first Roman Catholic  Archbishop of Sydney, Australia.

Early life
Polding was born in Liverpool, England on 18 November 1794. His father was of Dutch descent and his mother came from the Brewer family, recusants since the sixteenth century. His family name was also spelled Poulden or Polten. His parents died and at age 8 he was placed in the care of his uncle, Father Bede Brewer, president-general of the English Benedictine Congregation.

Polding was first taught by the Benedictine nuns of the Convent of Our Lady of Consolation of Cambray, who as refugees from revolutionary France were located at Much Woolton, near Liverpool. At 11, he was sent to St Gregory's Benedictine College, at Acton Burnell, near Shrewsbury, Shropshire. On 15 July 1810 Polding was admitted to the religious community, taking the name of Bede, in honor of the saint, and of his uncle. He received minor orders in 1813 from Bishop Milner at Wolverhampton, was ordained priest by Bishop Poynter at Old Hall College on 4 March 1819, and filled in turn the offices of parish priest, prefect, novice-master, and sub-prior in his monastery. In 1819 Polding's cousin, Bishop Edward Bede Slater, was appointed vicar apostolic with jurisdiction over Mauritius, Madagascar, the Cape, New Holland and Van Diemen's Land.

Experiences in Australia

In 1834 Polding was appointed bishop of Hierocaesarea in partibus infidelium and Vicar Apostolic of New Holland, Van Diemen's Land and the adjoining islands. Polding and party arrived first in Hobart on 6 August 1835. Leaving a priest and a student there, he travelled on and arrived in Sydney on 13 September 1835. The authorities soon realized the good effect his influence was having, and arranged that, on the arrival of every ship-load of convicts, all the Catholics should be placed at his disposal for some days, during which the bishop and his assistants saw each prisoner personally and did all they could for them before they were drafted off to their various destinations. Polding travelled widely throughout Australia and was regarded as hard-working. He traveled to Europe in November 1840, appointing Francis Murphy to serve as vicar general of the diocese during his absence.

On 5 April 1842, Polding was appointed the first Bishop of Sydney and subsequently Archbishop on 22 April 1842. Some sources report that as a result of a successful diplomatic mission to Malta, Archbishop Polding was made a Count of the Holy Roman Empire. This cannot be true, since the Holy Roman Empire was dissolved de facto in 1806. It is possible, on the other hand, that he was made a papal Count. Reports are probably accurate which say that he was appointed an Assistant at the Pontifical Throne, an honorific title formerly granted by the Popes to some bishops.

Despite his many successes as a founding bishop, Polding experienced a degree of resistance from his largely Irish Catholic church in Australia. Even after the English Catholic Emancipation Act of 1829, the Irish were resistant to non-Irish bishops. The British anti-clerical laws of the Reformation Parliament and the Act of Supremacy had bred deep resentment among the Irish against the English, and the consequences of the dissolution of monasteries during the English Reformation had left Polding deeply committed to the primary vision of restoring monasticism in English-speaking lands such as Australia.

In 1843 Polding established a mission for Aboriginal people at Moongalba on Stradbroke Island, staffed by Passionist priests. However, the attempt failed and the Passionists left the island not long afterwards.

He helped establish St John's College, University of Sydney and Mary's College, Lyndhurst. Polding travelled again to Rome in 1846 hoping to obtain a coadjutor bishop and Benedictine nuns to help in his diocese. He was successful in these quests and also gained approval for the establishment of Melbourne as a separate see. With his support, the Religious Sisters of Charity began the House of the Good Shepherd. In 1857 Polding established the Sisters of the Good Samaritan, an Australian congregation of Religious women.
 
In January 1874, he retired to Sacred Heart Presbytery, Darlinghurst.

Archbishop Bede Polding, O.S.B., died on 16 March 1877 in Sydney, aged 82, and was initially buried in Petersham Cemetery. He was later reinterred St Mary's Cathedral.

Legacy
Apart from the many churches he founded, Polding began the construction of the second St Mary's Cathedral, Sydney in 1868, where he was later re-buried. Polding also founded the Sisters of the Good Samaritan in Sydney.

Bede Polding College, South Windsor,  in the state of New South Wales, Australia is named after him, and students follow his morals and values each day.

Polding Street in Fairfield, New South Wales is also named after him.

References

Sources
Bede Nairn, 'Polding, John Bede (1794–1877)', Australian Dictionary of Biography, Volume 2, MUP, 1967, pp 340–347.

1794 births
1877 deaths
Clergy from Liverpool
English people of Dutch descent
People educated at Downside School
English Benedictines
English Roman Catholic missionaries
British emigrants to Australia
Roman Catholic archbishops of Sydney
Clergy from Sydney
Benedictine bishops
19th-century Roman Catholic archbishops in Australia
Founders of Catholic religious communities
Burials at St Mary's Cathedral, Sydney
Roman Catholic missionaries in Australia
Roman Catholic bishops of Sydney